Jack Wells may refer to:

 John K. Wells (fl. 1920s), American filmmaker in Australia
 Jack Wells (footballer) (1883–1966)
 Jack Wells (sportscaster) (1911–1999)
 Jack Wells (gymnast) (1926–2010)
 Jack Wells (rugby league) (born 1997)
 John Barnes Wells (1880–1935), American tenor and composer

See also
 John Wells (disambiguation)